Sons of Ingmar, also released in the United Kingdom under the title Dawn of Love, is a 1919 Swedish drama film directed by Victor Sjöström. It is the first part of his adaptation of Selma Lagerlöf's novel Jerusalem, originally published in 1901 and 1902. It was followed by a second part, Karin, Daughter of Ingmar, the following year.

Main cast
 Victor Sjöström as Lill Ingmar Ingmarsson
 Harriet Bosse as Brita
 Tore Svennberg as Stor Ingmar Ingmarsson
 Hildur Carlberg as Marta
 Hjalmar Peters as Brita's Father
 Svea Peters as Brita's Mother
 Axel Nilsson as Painter

References

External links
 

1919 drama films
1919 films
Swedish black-and-white films
Films based on works by Selma Lagerlöf
Films directed by Victor Sjöström
Swedish silent feature films
Swedish drama films
Silent drama films